Qasem Khel or Qasem Kheyl  is a village in Logar Province, in eastern Afghanistan. It lies about 50 kilometres northeast of Gardez and 80 kilometres southeast of Kabul.

Fossiliferous Permian sequences have been described at Qasim Khel, Ali Khel and at Jalalabad and Altimur (Altamur) by Kaever (1965, 1967) and Weippert et al. (1970).

References

Populated places in Logar Province